The 'National Institute of Culture of Peru (INC) is a government organization under the authority of the Ministry of Education. Its headquarters are located in the city of Lima and its rector is Cecilia Bákula.

Objectives
The institute's objectives are to promote culture, to spread knowledge of cultural demonstrations and of the national cultural heritage, to contribute to national development, and to enlist the participation of the community and private sector, and to encourage international integration. The Regulations of the Organization and Functions of the INC are defined by Supreme Decree 027-2001-ED of April 20, 2001.

Functions
To formulate and execute the policies and strategies of the State in regards to cultural development, cultural conservation, and the diffusion and investigation of affairs related to the cultural heritage of Peru

See also
Tourism in Peru
Culture of Peru
Ministry of Foreign Commerce and Tourism

References
Intituto Nacional de Cultura del Perú

Government agencies of Peru